This article lists the squads for the 2016 Cyprus Women's Cup, the 9th edition of the Cyprus Women's Cup. The cup consisted of a series of friendly games, and was held in Cyprus from 2 to 9 March 2016. The eight national teams involved in the tournament registered a squad of 23 players.

The age listed for each player is on 2 March 2016, the first day of the tournament. The numbers of caps and goals listed for each player do not include any matches played after the start of tournament. The club listed is the club for which the player last played a competitive match prior to the tournament. The nationality for each club reflects the national association (not the league) to which the club is affiliated. A flag is included for coaches that are of a different nationality than their own national team.

Group A

Austria
Coach: Dominik Thalhammer

The squad was announced on 12 February 2016.

Hungary
Coach: Edina Markó

The squad was announced on 25 February 2016.

Ireland
Coach: Susan Ronan

The squad was announced on 26 February 2016.

Italy
Coach: Antonio Cabrini

The squad was announced on 22 February 2016. Sara Gama was replaced by Eleonora Piacezzi.

Group B

Czech Republic
Coach: Stanislav Krejčík

The squad was announced on 19 February 2016. On 28 February 2016, Adéla Odehnalová was replaced by Tereza Koubová.

Finland
Coach:  Andrée Jeglertz

The squad was announced on 18 February 2016.

Poland
Coach: Wojciech Basiuk

The squad was announced on 15 February 2016.

Wales
Coach: Jayne Ludlow

The squad was announced on 18 February 2016.

Player representation
Statistics are per the beginning of the competition.

By club
Clubs with 4 or more players represented are listed.

By club nationality

By club federation

By representatives of domestic league

References

2016